Liam Hayes, also known as Plush, is an American musician.

Liam Hayes may also refer to:

 Liam Hayes (Gaelic footballer) (born 1974), Irish Gaelic footballer
 Liam Hayes (hurler), Irish hurler

See also

 Liam (disambiguation)
 Hayes (disambiguation)